The 2010 New Zealand local elections were triennial elections to select local government officials and district health board members. All elections are conducted by postal ballot, with election day being Saturday 9 October 2010.

Elected were:
 Mayors and councillors for all 67 territorial authority councils
 Councillors for 10 regional councils, (all regional councils had elections except  Canterbury Regional Council, and the Auckland Regional Council which will be replaced by the Auckland Council)
 Members of all 20 District Health Boards (DHBs)
 Members for all 21 local boards of the Auckland Council
 Various local and community boards and licensing trusts.

Except for all DHBs and six territorial authorities, officials were elected by the First Past the Post system. Members of DHBs and mayors and councillors in six territorial authorities, including Wellington City and Dunedin City, were elected using the Single Transferable Vote system.

Dates 
Under section 10 of the Local Electoral Act 2001, a "general election of members of every local authority or community board must be held on the second Saturday in October in every third year" from the date the Act came into effect in 2001, meaning 9 October 2010.

Key dates for the election as set out by the Local Government Commission and Elections New Zealand are:

Changes in 2010

Auckland Council 

This was the first time elections were held for the new Auckland Council, and the 2010 Auckland mayoral election took place concurrently.

Canterbury Regional Council
The 2010 elections did not include Canterbury Regional Council. In March 2010, the National Government passed special legislation deferring Canterbury Regional Council's election until 2013 and replacing the existing councillors with appointed commissioners.

Southern District Health Board 
The 2010 elections were the first for the Southern District Health Board, which was formed from the merger of the Otago and Southland DHBs on 1 May 2010. The Southern DHB had 14 members from the two former boards, but was reduced to the standard seven elected members after the election.

Leftward shift 
There was a notable leftward shift in the local elections throughout the country and many notable long term centre-right mayors were replaced by left-wing mayors throughout the country. In the new position of Auckland supermayor, Manukau City mayor Len Brown a Labour party politician replaced centre-right Auckland City mayor John Banks. In Wellington, Green Party candidate Celia Wade-Brown replaced right leaning, Kerry Prendergast. As well as at the provincial levels new left-wing mayors replaced retiring incumbents in Wanganui and New Plymouth and incumbent mayors like that of Janie Annear in Timaru defeated conservative challengers.

Individual elections
Elections are split into their respective regions:
Auckland region
Wellington region
Dunedin City Council

Notable elections
Auckland mayoral – The first mayoral election for the new Auckland Council was won by incumbent Manukau City mayor Len Brown with 221,365 votes over incumbent Auckland City mayor John Banks by 60,198 votes.
Rangitikei mayoral – For the first time in 21 years a mayor would be re-elected unopposed in the Rangitikei District as mayor Chalky Leary was re-elected without challenge.
Wellington City mayoral – At the end of election night, incumbent Kerry Prendergast was ahead by 40 votes over city councillor Celia Wade-Brown. On the Wednesday following the election, after the counting of 632 special votes, Celia Wade-Brown beat incumbent Kerry Prendergast by a total of 176 votes, 24,881 to 24,705 votes, with voter turnout of 40.11 percent, a slight increase on the 2007 election turnout of 40 percent.
Christchurch mayoral – Incumbent Bob Parker won with 68,245 votes, a majority of 16,679 over Wigram MP Jim Anderton. Initially second-place to Anderton, the vote swung in Parker's favour after his response and unintentional publicity following the 2010 Canterbury earthquake that damaged the city five weeks to the day before the election.
Dunedin mayoral – City councillor Dave Cull won with 22,382 votes at the last iteration (21,757 first preference), defeating incumbent Peter Chin, who received 14,453 votes at last iteration (14,084 first preference).
Invercargill mayoral – Incumbent Tim Shadbolt won with 16,275 votes, a majority of 10,964 over singer Suzanne Prentice.

See also
Elections in New Zealand
2004 New Zealand local elections
2007 New Zealand local elections

References

External links
Elections New Zealand – Local Elections 
Local Elections 2010 – information for voters
2010 elections at the Auckland City Council
2010 election results summary

 
Local 2010
October 2010 events in New Zealand